State Road 37 (SR 37) is a major route in the U.S. state of Indiana, running as a four-lane divided highway for 110 miles of its course.

At one time, the route ran from the southwest corner of the state to the northeast corner. In the pre-Interstate Highway era, Indiana 37 was the most direct route between Fort Wayne and Indianapolis. Interstate 69 has supplanted it as a through route, and State Road 37 now consists of two disconnected segments. The longer segment starts at Tell City on the Ohio River and ends in Marion in north central Indiana. The other segment in northeastern Indiana runs from Interstate 469 near Fort Wayne to the Ohio state line.

Route description

Southern segment 
The southern section of Indiana SR 37 begins at a junction with SR 66 near the Ohio River in Tell City. Angling northeast, it enters the Hoosier National Forest then turns north until it meets Interstate 64 just north of State Road 62 at St. Croix. SR 37 now continues north beyond I-64, to eventually meet SR 64 near Eckerty. Just prior to reaching Paoli SR 37 leaves the National Forest. Once in town the route has a very brief (two block) concurrency with US 150 and SR 56 to loop around the town square before it leaves to the north, heading for Orleans and Mitchell.

Until reaching Mitchell, SR 37 is a two-lane rural route with relatively light traffic. However, from this point north to Indianapolis, the character of the road changes to become a major rural arterial route. At Mitchell the 4-lane divided highway begins with a short concurrency of SR 60 on SR 37 as both routes skirt the edge of town. From there, SR 37 continues north to US 50 on the outskirts of Bedford. US 50 and SR 37 then run concurrently, curving northeast to cross the East Fork of the White River before turning north to bypass the center of the city on its west side. After US 50 leaves to the east, SR 37 proceeds northward to Bloomington, where it now meets up with the new southern extension of Interstate 69 on that city's southwest side.

From that point in Bloomington heading north to Martinsville, SR 37 was converted from an expressway to a full freeway to allow for I-69 to run concurrently along its path and was completed October 31, 2018. Conversion of the stretch between Martinsville and a point just south of I-465 on the southwest side of Indianapolis is planned to follow, which will complete the southern extension of I-69 between Evansville and Indianapolis.

The present southern junction of SR 37 and I-465 is at the Harding Street interchange (exit 4 of the beltway). From there, the (unsigned) state road proceeds counterclockwise around the beltway to exit 37 (I-69/SR 37/Binford Boulevard) in the Castleton neighborhood of Indianapolis' northeast side.

Northeast of Noblesville, SR 37 reverts to a two-lane rural highway. Along the Hamilton—Madison County line it runs concurrent with SR 13 until those routes split just south of Elwood. From there, SR 37 angles north-northeast to reach the present northern terminus of the southern section at SR 9 just south of Marion.

The portions of SR 37 between Tell City and I-64, and from Paoli to Bedford, were designated as the Frank O'Bannon Highway, to honor the late former governor, following his death in 2003. Between the two SR 37 segments, the O'Bannon Highway designation follows SR 145, SR 56 and US 150 past Patoka Lake, through French Lick and West Baden Springs to Paoli.

Northern segment 
The northern section of Indiana SR 37 begins at a junction with Interstate 469 on the northeast side of Fort Wayne. The road continues on northeast in Ohio as State Route 2, to Hicksville, Ohio and beyond.

History

Southern section 
SR 37 was once a section of the Dixie Highway from Indianapolis to Paoli.

In the 1950s, SR 37 ran north of Bloomington on the roads now called Cascades Drive and Old 37 to the northern end of Monroe County. South of Bloomington, SR 37 followed Walnut Street Pike, Fairfax Road, Valley Mission Road, Guthrie Road, and Kentucky Hollow Road (Old 37) to Oolitic. These were replaced in the late 1950s and early 1960s with the straighter sections called College Avenue and Walnut Street north of Bloomington and the sections called Walnut Street and Old 37 (Kentucky Hollow Road) south to Oolitic. As soon as the current 4-lane 37 was finished in 1976, a portion of Kentucky Hollow Road was abandoned north of Oolitic and a stone quarry that was alongside SR 37 for years consumed the road.

SR 37 now turns to the east and is concurrent with SR 64 from Eckerty to English, where it exits the eastbound highway and rejoins the old route.  The old, winding stretch of 37 from I-64 at Exit 86 north to English has been designated as SR 237. This change, which occurred between 2009 and 2014, also eliminated the SR 37 concurrency with I-64 between that route's exits 79 and 86.

Indianapolis 

SR 37 originally ended at the junction of SR 35 (SR 135) and US 31 at Meridian and South Streets in downtown.  The route that became SR 37 was originally numbered SR 13 in Marion and most of Hamilton Counties.  SR 13 began at Meridian and Michigan Streets, then the junction of US 31, SR 13 and SR 367.

SR 13 then followed Meridian St. (US 31) north to Fall Creek Parkway N. Drive, where it turned northeast.  SR 13 then followed Fall Creek and Allisonville Road to Strawtown in Hamilton County, where what is now SR 37 was undesignated until 1940.  In 1940, the portion from north of Strawtown to south of Elwood was made part of SR 13.  From south of Elwood to Marion, the road that is now SR 37 was numbered SR 15.  By 1945, the entire route described above became a continuation of SR 37 from the south side of Indianapolis.  SR 37 was designated along Michigan St. (westbound) and Vermont St. (eastbound) from Meridian St to West Street (at the time US 36, SR 29 and SR 67).  SR 37 then turned south on West Street, until it became Bluff Road, at which point it was already part of SR 37.  (This also removed the Bluff Road section of SR 37 from the state road system, removing the connection with SR 135.)

In 1953, the state rerouted SR 37 to multiplex with US 36/SR 67 along 38th Street starting at Fall Creek Parkway.  (This would be part of the route the road would follow until decommissioning in 1999 or 2000.)  The three roads would be multiplexed from 38th and Fall Creek, to 38th and Northwestern Ave. (now Dr. MLK Jr. St.), then south along Northwestern Ave. and West St. until the above-mentioned location at Michigan and West Streets.

In 1957, construction was started on the Noblesville Bypass of SR 37.  This bypass was designed to go to the east side of Noblesville, through Fishers, and along a newly constructed road in Marion County to connect to Fall Creek Parkway just north of the then route of SR 37 (Allisonville Road).  One of the "quirks" in the design of the new SR 37 was a five-point intersection with SR 100, at the corner of Shadeland Road (now Avenue) and 82nd Street.  By 1958, SR 37's Noblesville bypass was completed to the JCT SR 100 from the north.  SR 37 then was rerouted along 82nd St to Allisonville, where it turned south to connect to Fall Creek Parkway has it had for the previous 35 years.  By 1959, the new route was completed, with the Allisonville Road route renumbered SR 37A.

In the early to mid-1960s, two changes were made to SR 37.  One which would eventually become part of I-69: interchanges were built at SR 100 and 116th St., as well as a connection to the under construction I-465.  The second was the construction of an exit ramp (now Exit 4) on I-465 for the eventual construction of a Bluff Road bypass through southern Marion and northern Johnson Counties.

In 1967, there were two SR 37s on the south side of Indianapolis: one along Bluff Road, one along the Bluff Road bypass.  The two did not directly connect to each other at all.  By 1969, SR 37 was multiplexed with US 31 (along Meridian, North, Pennsylvania/Delaware, Madison and East Streets) to I-465/I-74 at what is now Exit 2.  The route then was multiplexed with I-465/I-74 between Exits 2 and 4.  This made the Bluff Road route abandoned in its connections to the state road system, so it was decommissioned.  Some unofficial maps list Bluff Road as SR 37A for some time after this, although the state of Indiana never recognized it as such.

By 1972, I-69 was completed along the SR 37 corridor from I-465 to where it had ended to that point at the JCT SR 37 Noblesville bypass (now Exit 205).

SR 37 stayed much the same until 1999 or 2000, when all state and US highway designations were completely removed from inside the I-465 loop.  SR 37 was then officially rerouted along I-465 along the east and south sides of Indianapolis.  The current interchange for SR 37 from I-465 is exit 37.

Northern section 
In 1940, the section of SR 37 from its current northern junction with SR 13 to Marion (west of its current routing) was designated SR 15.  Another section that was to become SR 37, from Fort Wayne northeast to the Ohio border, was already designated SR 14.

By 1945, SR 37 had been routed along its current route from Rigdon to south of Marion to the junction of SR 9.  SR 37 was then multiplexed along SR 9 from that junction to Huntington, then with US 24 from Huntington to Fort Wayne.  The state then moved SR 14 from what became SR 37 to what was SR 230.

In Fort Wayne, the combined US 24/SR 37 followed Upper Huntington Road (now Jefferson Boulevard) until it met up with SR 14 at Illinois Road. Just beyond that junction, the three routes split into a one way pair, with Jefferson Boulevard and Maumee Avenue handling eastbound traffic and Washington Boulevard used for westbound travel. East of downtown, SR 37 departed the pairing with US 24/SR 14, turning north onto Anthony Boulevard to cross the Maumee River. Roughly  later, the route turned northeast onto Crescent Avenue, which becomes Stellhorn Road at Hobson Road/St. Joe Road as it curves to run due east. Finally, SR 37 turned (later curved) onto Maysville Road, angling northeast again and then passing the point where an interchange would eventually be built with the I-469 beltway (where the north segment of this state road now begins).

By 1980, the official multiplex along SR 9 and US 24 was decommissioned (although there is a reference to SR 37 being multiplexed along I-69 around the west side of Fort Wayne in 1980, that reference was gone by 1982). This created the northern section of SR 37, with its origin point located at Crescent Avenue and Coliseum Boulevard (then US 30, now SR 930) in Fort Wayne. When I-469 was later completed, the mileage between Coliseum Boulevard and I-469 was decommissioned and returned to local control.

Future 

SR 37 between Bloomington and Indianapolis is slated to become part of the southern extension of Interstate 69. While this stretch is already a 4-lane partially access-controlled expressway, its present configuration still falls well short of Interstate freeway standards in that it contains numerous at-grade intersections, including 19 with traffic signals. The section between the recently built I-69 interchange north of Victor Pike in Bloomington to the curve south of Epler Avenue in Indianapolis will be upgraded to have full access control, and from that point a brief new terrain connection will be built due north to a new system interchange at I-465/I-74. The segment between Bloomington and Martinsville was completed on October 31, 2018 and the section between Martinsville and Indianapolis is scheduled to be fully completed in 2024. Once construction is completed, SR 37 will be decommissioned between Bloomington and Fishers as it overlaps with I-69.

Beginning January 2, 2021, a portion of SR 37 was closed in Martinsville to allow for quicker construction of I-69 in the area. Construction was completed 11 months later, and the road was re-opened to traffic on December 20, 2021.

Major intersections

Related route 

State Road 37A (SR 37A) ran from Indianapolis to Noblesville from 1959 until the 1970s.  Beginning sometime between 1957 and 1959, the designation SR 37A was first used for the old routing of SR 37 between Indianapolis and Noblesville. The southern end of the road was moved to SR 100 in late 1963 or early 1964. In late 1964 or early 1965 the route was shortened at the north end, with the new end being at an intersection with SR 32 and SR 38. In late 1969 or early 1970 the designation of SR 37A in Hamilton County was removed. The state highway commission removed the last segment of SR 37A in Marion County in either late 1972 or early 1973.

SR 37A (Allisonville Road) began at its southern terminus with its parent route, SR 37 (now Binford Boulevard), near the Indiana State Fairgrounds. The route traveled northeast crossing 52nd and 56th streets, Kessler Boulevard East Drive, and 62nd, 65th, 71st, 75th, and 79th streets, before it reached an intersection with East 82nd Street near Castleton Square Mall. The route then interchanged with Interstate 465 (I-465 Exit 35), followed by intersections with 86th, 91st, and 96th streets, then crossed into Hamilton County and the town of Fishers.

In Fishers, the route intersected East 106th Street near Indianapolis Metropolitan Airport. The route intersected 116th, 126th, and 131st streets, then passed by Conner Prairie Interactive History Park. The route then crossed 141st and 146th streets, entering the city of Noblesville. Just south of downtown Noblesville, Allisonville Road turned north and becomes South 10th Street. In downtown, the route reached an intersection with SR 32/SR 38 (Conner Street). North of downtown, the route once again turned northeast and became Allisonville Road. The route then intersected East 191st Street. After East 191st Street, the route turned east and crossed Cumberland Road. After Cumberland Road, the route turned southeast and reached its northern terminus at its parent route, SR 37 (Strawtown Pike) on the far north side of Noblesville.

References

External links 

Indiana Highway Ends - State Road 37

037
Interstate 69
Dixie Highway
Transportation in Fort Wayne, Indiana
Transportation in Indianapolis
Transportation in Perry County, Indiana
Transportation in Crawford County, Indiana
Transportation in Orange County, Indiana
Transportation in Lawrence County, Indiana
Transportation in Monroe County, Indiana
Transportation in Morgan County, Indiana
Transportation in Johnson County, Indiana
Transportation in Marion County, Indiana
Transportation in Hamilton County, Indiana
Transportation in Madison County, Indiana
Transportation in Grant County, Indiana
Transportation in Allen County, Indiana